The Lincoln River is a  river in Mason County, Michigan, in the United States.
Part of Lincoln river runs through a small private community called epworth

See also
List of rivers of Michigan

References

Michigan  Streamflow Data from the USGS

Rivers of Michigan
Rivers of Mason County, Michigan
Tributaries of Lake Michigan